KODZ (99.1 FM) is a commercial radio station in Eugene, Oregon, broadcasting to the Eugene-Springfield radio market. The station is owned by Bicoastal Media and airs a classic hits radio format.

The studios and offices are on River Valley Road in Springfield.  The transmitter is off Hill Road north of Springfield, amid towers for other Eugene-area FM and TV stations.  KODZ is also heard on an FM translator station in Florence, K237EC 95.3 MHz.

History
The station signed on the air in November 1968 as KPNW-FM. It was owned by Pacific Northwest Broadcasting, along with AM 1120 KPNW.   KPNW-FM carried an automated beautiful music format, featuring 15 minute sweeps of mostly instrumental cover versions of pop songs, Broadway and Hollywood show tunes.

Over time, KPNW-FM decreased the instrumentals and added more soft vocals, with DJs replacing the automation during some hours.  In the mid-1980s, it transitioned to a soft adult contemporary sound, branded as "Lite 99.1".

In 1991, KPNW-AM-FM were bought by McCoy Broadcasting for $4 million.  In 1994, McCoy Broadcasting switched KPNW-FM to oldies.  To reflect the new format, it changed its call sign to KODZ.

KODZ and KPNW were acquired by Clear Channel Communications in 2000.  Clear Channel began to shift the playlist from oldies of the late 1950s, 1960s, and 1970s to classic hits of the 1970s and 1980s.

Current owner Bicoastal Media acquired KODZ and KPNW in 2007.  Under Bicoastal Media's ownership, KODZ has added some 1990s titles and limited the 1970s songs.

Translators
KODZ broadcasts on the following translator:

References

External links
KODZ official website

ODZ
Classic hits radio stations in the United States
1968 establishments in Oregon
Radio stations established in 1968